Monster High: Boo York, Boo York (also titled Boo York Boo York: A Monsterrific Musical!) is a 2015 computer-animated musical adventure fantasy children's film released on home video on September 29 and broadcast on Nickelodeon as a television special on October 25.

Directed by William Lau and written by Keith Wagner, who also provided its story and screenplay, the film is the 12th in the list of CGI-animated films based on the Monster High doll franchise by Mattel. The soundtrack charted on Billboard's US Kid Albums and US Soundtracks.

Plot
Cleo de Nile's father Ramses invites his daughters to attend a fancy gala in Boo York featuring the showing of the Comet Crystal and heralding the arrival of a comet from outer space. Cleo invites her boyfriend Deuce and classmates Frankie, Clawdeen, Draculaura, Operetta, and Catty Noir, the last of whom has been struggling to come up with a new original song. They meet aspiring performer Luna Mothews, robotic DJ Elle Eedee, and ballerina Mouscedes King. They also bump into Toralei, who was invited by Cleo's sister Nefera. Ramses and Nefera conspire to take over Boo York by trying to set up Cleo with the gala patron Amuncommon Ptolemy's son Seth, where, if Cleo and Seth make a promise under the comet's power, the promise cannot be unbroken. Meanwhile, back at Monster High, Ghoulia discovers the comet seems to be on a collision course to Earth, and tries to stop it before it blows up the entire world.

Voice cast 
Cast listing from closing credits:
 Karen Strassman as Catty Noir
 Celeste Henderson as Cleo de Nile, Clawdeen Wolf
 Wendee Lee as Nefera de Nile
 T. J. Smith as Pharaoh and Seth Ptolemy
 America Young as Toralei Stripe
 Rachel Staman as Mouscedes King
 Laura Bailey as Elle Eedee, Head Mistress Bloodgood, Lagoona Blue
 Lauren Weisman as Luna Mothews
 Erin Fitzgerald as Astranova, Abbey Bominable, Slug Monster
 Kate Higgins as Frankie Stein
 Cindy Robinson as Operetta, Mrs. Ptolemy
 Sue Swan as Draculaura
 Audu Paden as Ghoulia Yelps, Ramses de Nile, Mr. Hack, Manny Taur, Narrator, Neckbet the Waiter
 Cameron Clarke as Heath Burns, Mr. Rotter, Crazy Deady
 Evan Smith as Deuce Gorgon, Two Headed Agent
 Jonquil Goode as Twyla
 Todd Haberkorn as Skeletal Mummy

Soundtrack

Track listing

Charts

Merchandise
Several doll lines were developed from Boo York, Boo York: City Ghouls, City Schemes, Gala Ghoulfriends, Frightseers, Comet-Crossed Couple, and Out-of-Tombers.

Author Perdita Finn released a junior novel for the book which was published by Little, Brown Books for Young Readers in 2015, a Passport to Reading book titled Catty Finds Her Voice and a kids book called Welcome to Boo York.

References

External links 
 The film's official website (Archived)
 

2015 computer-animated films
2010s American animated films
Films based on fashion dolls
Films based on Mattel toys
Universal Pictures direct-to-video films
Monster High
Films set in New York City
Films directed by William Lau
2010s English-language films